Nicke Kabamba (born 1 February 1993) is an English footballer who plays as a striker for National League side Barnet.

Club career

Early career
Kabamba was a sprinter when young, but opted to play football instead. He joined Uxbridge in 2011 after scoring 13 goals for Hayes & Yeading United's under-18 team. He impressed enough with the reserve squad to grant a debut on 22 November in a Southern League Cup 3–1 defeat at Northwood.

Kabamba left Uxbridge in October 2013 and signed for A.F.C. Hayes. After a goalscoring debut against North Greenford United, he only scored one further goal for the club, in a 2–1 away loss against Potters Bar Town, before leaving in November. He subsequently moved to Burnham before the window break, and started to score in a regular basis.

On 30 September 2014 Kabamba scored five goals in a game including a hat-trick in the opening 10 minutes as Burnham beat Bideford 5–1 in the Southern League. On 5 December 2014, he was loaned to Hemel Hempstead Town until the end of the season.

Hampton & Richmond Borough
In August 2015, Kabamba signed for Hampton & Richmond Borough on loan, later making the move permanent in January 2016. He became the club's top scorer in the 2015–16 season with 18 goals, as it achieved promotion to National League South.

Portsmouth
On 18 January 2017, Kabamba signed an 18-month contract with League Two club Portsmouth with the option of a 12-month extension. He made his debut for the club on 18 March, replacing Noel Hunt in a 3–0 away defeat to Stevenage.

On 31 August 2017, Kabamba signed for Colchester United until January 2018, becoming the fifth player to enter Colchester on deadline day. He made his Colchester debut on 9 September in their 3–1 win against Crawley Town. After failing to score in ten appearances for Colchester, he returned to his parent club on 14 December.

On 5 January 2018, Kabamba joined National League side Aldershot Town on loan for the remainder of the campaign. On 9 May, Portsmouth announced that his contract, which would expire on 30 June, would not be renewed.

Havant and Waterlooville
On 14 June 2018, Kabamba signed for National League newcomers Havant and Waterlooville and has made 32 appearances and scored 6 goals across all competitions.

Hartlepool United
On 18 January 2019, in a return to full-time professional football, Kabamba signed on loan for fellow national league side Hartlepool United, scoring 5 goals in his first 4 starts. He finished his loan spell with 7 goals in 17 National League appearances, including a goal in a 3–2 win over Salford City F.C. on the final game of the season which ended their opponents' title run. Kabamba signed a permanent deal on 13 May 2019.

Kilmarnock
Kabamba signed for Scottish Premiership club Kilmarnock on a one-and-a-half year contract on 17 January 2020. He scored on his debut, coming off the bench in a 6–0 win against Queen's Park in the Scottish Cup.

Northampton Town
On 2 June 2021, Kabamba joined Northampton Town of League Two on a two-year deal. 

On 21 January 2022, Kabamba joined Woking on loan for the remainder of the campaign.

Kabamba had his contract terminated in June 2022.

Barnet
On 21 June 2022, the same day in which he had his Northampton Town contract terminated, Kabamba joined National League club Barnet.

International career
On 22 September 2020, Kabamba was called-up by the DR Congo.

Career statistics

References

External links
Portsmouth FC profile

1993 births
Living people
Footballers from the London Borough of Brent
Association football forwards
English footballers
Uxbridge F.C. players
A.F.C. Hayes players
Burnham F.C. players
Hemel Hempstead Town F.C. players
Hampton & Richmond Borough F.C. players
Portsmouth F.C. players
Colchester United F.C. players
Aldershot Town F.C. players
National League (English football) players
Isthmian League players
English Football League players
Hartlepool United F.C. players
Kilmarnock F.C. players
Northampton Town F.C. players
Woking F.C. players
Barnet F.C. players
Scottish Professional Football League players
Black British sportspeople
English sportspeople of Democratic Republic of the Congo descent